Óscar Burrieza López (born 22 July 1975) is a Spanish tennis coach, former professional tennis player and sports columnist for the sports newspaper Marca. Known as "the best Galician tennis player of all time."

Career
Burrieza López struggled with injuries early in his career. In 1995 he required three operations on his left knee and on his Grand Slam debut, at the 1997 Australian Open, he had to retire after just four games against Richey Reneberg, having twisted his ankle.

The Spaniard lost in the opening round of the 1997 Wimbledon Championships, to Jason Stoltenberg .

He reached the quarter-finals of the 1998 Hong Kong Open.

In the 1999 Gerry Weber Open, Burrieza-Lopez had a win over world number 39 Magnus Larsson. At the same tournament the following year, he defeated Karim Alami, then ranked 30 in the world.

Challenger titles

Singles: (1)

Doubles: (1)

Notes

References

External links
 
 

1975 births
Living people
Spanish male tennis players
Sportspeople from Lugo
Spanish journalists